Claude Closky (born 22 May 1963) is a French Contemporary Artist who lives and works in Paris, France.

Reception 
Closky won the "Grand prix des Arts plastiques" (1999) and the Marcel Duchamp Prize (2005) awarded by the ADIAF.

Dike Blair wrote in Artforum Magazine that "The lightness of Closky's art belies the depth of its absurdist heredity. Working in a post-modernist mode, Closky's art works combine aspects of the Situationists, Fluxus, Beckett, Tall, Daniel Buren, and Andy Warhol."

Life and career 
Claude Closky has no formal training as a visual artist. He entered the ENSAD (Ecole National Supérieure des Arts Décoratifs) in 1982, but quit at the end of the first year to co-found The Ripoulin Brothers, a street artist collective, with Bla+Bla+Bla, Nina Childress, Jean Faucheur, Pierre Huyghe, Manhu, Ox, Trois carrés. In 1988, he left the group to develop his independent work, using voluntarily poor means such as drawing and printed matter.

He has participated in the Biennials of Lyon (1995), Sydney (1996), Taipei (2000), València (2001), Sharjah (2005), Venice (2017). In 2000, the Mudam (Luxembourg Art Museum) commissioned him to conceive and manage its website, for which he made a magazine and a gallery dedicated to the internet. The site was launched at the Luxembourg Pavilion in the 2001, Venice Biennale. It presented specific works by Heath Bunting, François Curlet, Pierre Leguillon, Aleksandra Mir, Peter Kogler, David Shrigley, among others. Since 2005, he has taught at the École nationale supérieure des Beaux-Arts in Paris. In 2012, he curated This & There, an exhibition to celebrate the tenth year of the Pavilion, Palais de Tokyo Laboratory for Creation (Paris) which presented the work of 74 artists in 74 different spaces.

Work 
The work of Claude Closky is mainly immaterial. Language is his model to articulate images, text, numbers, and sounds collected in our environment, or made in his studio. Although Closky is reluctant to produce objects and spectacular effects, his work still addresses issues about visibility and space appropriation.

Claude Closky's projects always find alternative ways to emancipate themselves from the formats imposed by the sites where they are exhibited. He seeks to point out the contradictions of our contemporary society and its representations, but also to question the role of art as producer of a cultural consensus and set of values. His works confront and question our environment, the conditions and benefits of artistic production, its relation to an audience.

Selected exhibitions

Selected publications

References

External links
 Claude Closky offline works.
 Claude Closky news.
 Claude Closky online works.
 Text by Lynne Cooke about Closky's commission for the Dia Art Foundation, 1997.
 Text by Dike Blair about Closky's art pieces for the web, 1999.
 Text by Marie Muracciole about Closky's exhibition at Museo Madre, Naples, 2007.
 Text by Marie Muracciole about Closky's exhibitions Laloli and Rarori, 2010.
 Square One, text by Katy Siegel and Paul Mattick, 2007.
 Internet Site of the Musée d'Art Moderne Grand-Duc Jean, Mudam Luxembourg, conceived by Claude Closky, 2000–2006.

1963 births
Living people
French mixed-media artists
Academic staff of the École des Beaux-Arts
École nationale supérieure des arts décoratifs alumni
French contemporary artists
New media artists